The Ocean Pier Railway at Atlantic City was an electric narrow gauge railway, which ran over the entire length of the 
Ocean Pier in Atlantic City, about  into the ocean.

History 
At the same time it was widened, and the railway, a fishing platform and several pavilions were built. The loop at the ocean end was broader and permitted a curve with  diameter. The power station was located at the inner end of the pier. Mr Young and Mr McShea were the builders and operated the railway line. The pleasant ride and the fine view of the city made the railroad a favorite with the summer visitors.

Rolling stock  

To prevent excessive friction and wear on the wheels Denney's divided axles were used, which permitted the wheels to rotate independently of each other. The coupling was of gun metal, in three pieces, which were riveted together after the brasses were in place. The portion of the coupling shown at the right in the cut was shrunk into that half of the axle. The collar at the extreme end of the coned portion of the 
axle was also shrunk on. A long conical bearing with adjustable brasses was provided as shown. The joints of the coupling were tight so that it could be filled with oil. With this axle little trouble was experienced from the sharp curves.

References 

Defunct railroads
Transportation in New Jersey
Defunct New Jersey railroads
Buildings and structures in Atlantic City, New Jersey
1897 establishments in New Jersey
Piers in New Jersey
Tourist attractions in Atlantic County, New Jersey
2 ft 9 in gauge railways